Frank H. Pears (1866–1923) was a Major League Baseball pitcher. He pitched in three games for the Kansas City Cowboys of the American Association in 1889 and in one game for the St. Louis Browns of the National League in 1893. He was still playing minor league ball as late as 1902, and was a player-manager in the minors in 1899.

Sources

Major League Baseball pitchers
Major League Baseball outfielders
Kansas City Cowboys players
St. Louis Browns (NL) players
Baseball players from Louisville, Kentucky
1866 births
1923 deaths
19th-century baseball players
Leadville Blues players
Kansas City Blues (baseball) players
Toledo Black Pirates players
Detroit Creams players
Sioux City Cornhuskers players
Detroit Tigers (Western League) players
Columbus Buckeyes (minor league) players
Columbus Senators players
Grand Rapids Rippers players
Grand Rapids Gold Bugs players
Paducah Little Colonels players
Quincy Little Giants players
St. Thomas Saints players
Omaha Indians players
Galveston Giants players
Austin Senators players
Minor league baseball managers